Sex magic (sometimes spelled sex magick) is any type of sexual activity used in magical, ritualistic or otherwise religious and spiritual pursuits. One practice of sex magic is using sexual arousal or orgasm with visualization of a desired result. A premise posited by sex magicians is the concept that sexual energy is a potent force that can be harnessed to transcend one's normally perceived reality.

Paschal Beverly Randolph

The earliest known practical teachings of sex magic in the Western world comes from 19th-century American occultist, Paschal Beverly Randolph (1825-1875). Son of a wealthy Virginian father and a slave mother, he was a well-known spiritualist who was greatly influenced by the work of English Rosicrucian and scholar of phallicism, Hargrave Jennings.

Randolph developed one of the most influential systems of sex magic. As per him, the moment when one reaches orgasm is the most intense and the most powerful experience a human can have in life, for in that moment the soul suddenly opens to the divine realm and the breath of God is infused. He said, "True sex-power is God-power". As such, the power of orgasm can be used by a man and woman for various gains, both worldly and spiritual. He wrote thus in The Mysteries of Eulis:

Success in any case requires the adjuvancy of a superior woman. THIS IS THE LAW! A harlot or low woman is useless for all such lofty and holy purposes ... The woman shall not be one who accepts rewards for compliance; nor a virgin; or under eighteen years of age; or another's wife; yet must be one who hath known man and who has been and still is capable of intense mental, volitional and affectionate energy, combined with perfect sexive and orgasmal ability; for it requires a double crisis to succeed... The entire mystery can be given in very few words, and they are: An upper room; absolute personal, mental, and moral cleanliness both of the man and wife. An observance of the law just cited during the entire term of the experiment -- 49 days. Formulate the desire and keep it in mind during the whole period and especially when making the nuptive prayer, during which no word may be spoken, but the thing desired be strongly thought...

Randolph insisted that for the magic to be effective and prayers be fulfilled, both the partners involved in should achieve orgasm at the same moment. His teachings were later passed on to numerous secret societies in Europe, the most notable being Ordo Templi Orientis or O.T.O founded by Carl Kellner
and Theodor Reuss.

Carl Kellner
Carl Kellner (1851-1905), the founder of Ordo Templi Orientis, (O.T.O.), claimed to have learned the techniques of sex magic from three adepts in this art. Beginning in 1904, references to these secrets, Kellner, and the O.T.O. began appearing in "an obscure German masonic periodical called Oriflamme." In 1912, the editors of Oriflamme announced:

Ida Craddock

In the latter part of the 19th century, sexual reformer Ida Craddock (1857-1902) published several works dealing with sacred sexuality, most notably Heavenly Bridegrooms and Psychic Wedlock. Aleister Crowley reviewed Heavenly Bridegrooms in the pages of his journal The Equinox, stating that it was:

...one of the most remarkable human documents ever produced, and it should certainly find a regular publisher in book form. The authoress of the MS. claims that she was the wife of an angel. She expounds at the greatest length the philosophy connected with this thesis. Her learning is enormous.

...This book is of incalculable value to every student of occult matters. No Magick library is complete without it.

Sexual techniques from Craddock's Psychic Wedlock were later reproduced in Sex Magick by O.T.O. initiate Louis T. Culling, a disciple of C.F. Russell.

Aleister Crowley
 

Aleister Crowley (1875-1947) became involved with Theodor Reuss and Ordo Templi Orientis following the publication of The Book of Lies between 1912 and 1913. According to Crowley's account, Reuss approached him and accused him of having revealed the innermost (sexual) secret of O.T.O. in one of the cryptic chapters of this book. When it became clear to Reuss that Crowley had done so unintentionally, he initiated Crowley into the IX° (ninth degree) of O.T.O. and appointed him "Sovereign Grand Master General of Ireland, Iona and all the Britains."

While the O.T.O. included, from its inception, the teaching of sex magick in the highest degrees of the Order, when Crowley became head of the Order, he expanded on these teachings and associated them with different degrees as follows:

 VIII°: masturbatory or autosexual magical techniques were taught, referred as the Lesser Work of Sol
 IX°: heterosexual magical techniques were taught
 XI°: anal intercourse magical techniques were taught.

Hugh Urban, professor of Comparative Religion at Ohio State University, noted Crowley's emphasis on sex as "the supreme magical power." According to Crowley:

Crowley wrote extensively on the topic of sex magick. Some of these works were published and made available to the general public, others were secret and could only be obtained by initiates of Ordo Templi Orientis.
 Liber IAO - IAO. Sexual Magick. Gives three methods of attainment through a willed series of thoughts. The active form of Liber CCCXLV.
 De Nuptis Secretis Deorum Cum Hominibus - Sexual magick
 Liber Stellae Rubeae - According to Crowley, a secret ritual of Apep, the heart of IAO-OAI, delivered unto V.V.V.V.V. for his use in a certain matter of The Book of the Law (Liber AL vel Legis). Sexual Magick veiled in symbolism.
 Liber Agape vel C vel Azoth - The Book of the Unveiling of the Sangraal wherein it is spoken of the Wine of the Sabbath of the Adepts. Secret instructions of the ninth degree of the O.T.O. (Sex Magick)
 Liber Cheth vel Vallum Abiegni - A perfect account of the task of the Exempt Adept considered under the symbols of a particular plane, not the intellectual. Sexual magick veiled in symbolism.
 Liber A'ash vel Capricorni Pneumatici - Analyzes the nature of the creative magical force in man, explains how to awaken it, how to use it and indicates the general as well as the particular objects to be gained thereby. Sexual magick heavily veiled in symbolism.
 The Book of Lies - includes some techniques in symbolic language, including extended mutual oral sex (Chapter 69) while intoxicated on hashish.
 The Paris Working - A record of homosexual magick operations.
 Energized Enthusiasm - An essay developing the idea of creativity as a sexual phenomenon. Specially adapted to the task of attainment of control of the Body of Light, development of intuition, and Hatha yoga.

Maria de Naglowska 
Maria de Naglowska (1883–1936) was a Russian occultist, mystic, author and journalist who wrote and taught about sexual magical ritual practices while also being linked with the Parisian surrealist movement. She established and led an occult society known as the Confrérie de la Flèche d'or (Brotherhood of the Golden Arrow) in Paris from 1932 to 1935. In 1931, she compiled, translated and published in French a collection of published and unpublished writings by American occultist Paschal Beverly Randolph on the subject of sexual magic and magic mirrors. Her translation and publication of Randolph's previously little known ideas and teachings was the source of Randolph's subsequent influence in European magic. She augmented the text with some of his oral teachings. The following year, she published a semi-autobiographical novella, Le Rite sacré de l'amour magique (The Sacred Ritual of Magical Love.)

Later that year, she also published La Lumière du sexe (The Light of Sex), a mystic treatise and guide to sexual ritual that was required reading for those seeking to be initiated into the Brotherhood of the Golden Arrow. Her later book on advanced sexual magic practices, Le Mystère de la pendaison (The Hanging Mystery) details her advanced teachings on the Third Term of the Trinity and the spiritually transformation power of sex, and the practice of erotic ritual hanging and other sensory deprivation practices. Beyond occult subjects, Naglowska also influenced the surrealist art movement. The Lexique succinct de l'érotisme in the catalog of the 1959 International Surrealist Exhibition in Paris noted her important influence. Surrealist Sarane Alexandrian wrote a detailed account of her life.

Samael Aun Weor

The crux of Samael Aun Weor's (1917-1977) teachings is what he calls "white sexual magic", the paramount tenet of which is to conclude the act without orgasm or ejaculation from either the man or woman. Thus, instead of the sexual energy being released in a spasm, this energy undergoes sexual transmutation via willpower and the sacrifice of desire. According to Aun Weor, the magnetic induction produced by crossing the active (phallus) and passive (uterus) creative organs causes lunar, solar and akashic currents to flow through the Brahmanic cord (the ida, pingala and sushumna nadis respectively) of the couple. He says that this current then provides an active connection between the magnetic center at the root of the nose (the pineal gland, Ajna chakra) and the solar and lunar principles located within the seminal system at the muladhara chakra. The transmuted energy, through willpower, is populated by what Aun Weor says are "billions of christic atoms" that when rising meet the pure akasa of the triune Brahmanic cord, igniting it, and through many years of work this causes the ascent of the kundalini through the thirty-three chambers or degrees of the spinal medulla.

Aun Weor says that along with the ascent of the kundalini, the crystallization of the "Solar Bodies" are formed due to the transmutation which occurs through white sexual magic. He says that the solar bodies are the four aspects of the sacred merkabah of Arcanum Seven. In sum, Aun Weor describes the solar bodies as the christic vehicles of emotion, mind and will.

Aun Weor says that because sexuality is both a creator and destroyer, à la Shiva-Shakti, through sexual magic he indicates that one can eliminate any previously comprehended psychological defect. In other words, he says that through sexual magic the radical removal of the egocentric vehicles can be achieved - which he says are the animalistic or inferior vehicles of emotion, mind, and will related to one's evolutive animal transmigrations prior to reaching the humanoid state. Thus, through the death of the ego and the birth of the solar bodies, Aun Weor states that one can be elevated to the angelic state and beyond.

Aun Weor also states that when the orgasm is reached the christic atoms are expelled and replaced, via genital orgasmic contraction, with what he believed were impure "atoms" of fornication. When, through willpower the akashic current meets the "atoms of fornication", he said, that instead of rising the energy is rejected by the divine triad (atman-buddhi-manas) and is forced downward into the atomic infernos of the human being, forming the "tail of satan", (the kundabuffer, or negatively polarized kundalini). He says that the repetition of orgasm over time divorces the divine triad from the inferior "quaternary" (physical, vital, astral and mental bodies) through the severing of the antakarana. This brings about, according to Aun Weor, "the fallen Bodhisattva", "the Fall of Lucifer" as described by the author Dante, or what amounts to the same thing: the Fall of Man. He refers to any type of sexual magic that uses the orgasm for spiritual or magical purposes as "black sexual magic", and he believed that those who perform it are black magicians who acquire negative powers.

See also

 Babalon Working
 Marjorie Cameron and Jack Parsons
 Ceremonial magic
 Chaos magic
 Charge of the Goddess
 Eroto-comatose lucidity
 Great Rite
 History of erotic depictions
 Hieros gamos
 Karezza
 Karmamudrā
 Maithuna
 Neotantra
 Religion and sexuality
 Sacred prostitution
 Sexuality in Christian demonology
 Spirit spouse
 Tantra
 Taoist sexual practices
 Tibetan tantric practice
 Vajrayana
 Yab-Yum

References

Notes

Citations

Works cited

Primary sources

 

Secondary sources

Further reading
  
 
 
 
 

Magic (supernatural)
Religious sex rituals
Sexual acts
Tantric practices

es:Magia#Magia sexual